Muliagateli Renera Josephine Thompson is Miss Samoa Australia, who was crowned Miss Earth Australia 2013 on October 12 in Brisbane. In 2014, she was crowned Miss Grand Australia 2014 in Miss Supranational and Grand Australia 2014 pageant. She represented Australia at the Miss Earth 2013 and Miss Grand International 2014 pageant.

Miss Grand International 2014
Renera Thompson was the one of the contestants who ran for the title of Miss Grand International 2014. She was able to do. In addition to placing in the top 20, she advanced to the top 5 final, finishing as Miss Grand International 2014-3rd runner up.

References

External links
 Miss Earth official website

Miss Earth 2013 contestants
Australian beauty pageant winners
Australian people of Samoan descent
Living people
Year of birth missing (living people)
Miss Grand International contestants